This is a list of diplomatic missions in Chile. There are currently 72 embassies in Santiago de Chile, and many countries maintain consulates in other Chilean cities (not including honorary consulates).

Diplomatic missions in Santiago de Chile

Embassies

Other missions or delegations 
 (Delegation)
 (Trade Office)

Gallery

Non-resident embassies accredited to Chile 
(Resident in Brasília unless otherwise noted)

 (Buenos Aires)
 (Ottawa)
 
 (Kingston)
 (Buenos Aires)
 (Kingston)
 

 (Buenos Aires)
 

 (Canberra)
 (Buenos Aires)
 (Washington, D.C.)
 

 
 (Tallinn)
 (Washington, D.C.)
 
 
 (Buenos Aires)
 
 (Caracas)

 
 (Washington, D.C.)
 
 
 
 (New York City)
 
 (New York City)
 (Washington, D.C.)
 (Valletta)
 (Washington, D.C.)
 (Havana)
 
 
 
 (Buenos Aires)
 
 (Washington, D.C.)
 (Buenos Aires)
 (Buenos Aires)
 (Washington, D.C.)
 (New York City)
 (Buenos Aires)

 (Buenos Aires)
 (Buenos Aires)
 
 
 (Washington, D.C.)
 
 (Washington, D.C.)

 
 (New York City)
 
 (Buenos Aires)
 (Washington, D.C.)

Consular missions

Santiago de Chile 
 (Consulate-General)

Antofagasta 
 (Consulate)
 (Consulate)
 (Consulate-General)

Arica 
 (Consulate-General)
 (Consulate-General)

Calama 
 (Consulate)

Concepción 
 (Consulate)

Iquique 
 (Consulate)
 (Consulate General)
 (Consulate)
 (Consulate-General)

Punta Arenas 
 (Consulate General)

Puerto Montt 
 (Consulate)

Valparaíso 
 (Consulate General)
 (Consulate General)

Closed missions

See also 
 Foreign relations of Chile
 Visa requirements for Chilean citizens

References

External links 
 Chilean Ministry of Foreign Affairs

list
Chile
Diplomatic missions